Edward Henry Oliver (9 July 1902 – 9 April 1995) was a British middle-distance runner. He competed in the men's 3000 metres steeplechase at the 1928 Summer Olympics.

References

1902 births
1995 deaths
Athletes (track and field) at the 1928 Summer Olympics
British male middle-distance runners
British male steeplechase runners
Olympic athletes of Great Britain
Place of birth missing